St. Luke's Episcopal Church is an Episcopal parish in Montclair, Essex County, New Jersey, United States, in the Episcopal Diocese of Newark.

Its historic parish church, at 73 S. Fullerton Avenue was built in 1889 and added to the National Register in 1988.

See also 
 National Register of Historic Places listings in Essex County, New Jersey

References

External links 
St Luke's Episcopal Church website
Montclair Public Schools

Montclair, New Jersey
Churches on the National Register of Historic Places in New Jersey
Gothic Revival church buildings in New Jersey
Churches completed in 1889
19th-century churches in the United States
Churches in Essex County, New Jersey
National Register of Historic Places in Essex County, New Jersey
New Jersey Register of Historic Places
Episcopal Diocese of Newark